The 2011 AFL season was the Adelaide Football Club's 21st season in the AFL. Neil Craig coached from round 1 to round 18, but was replaced by Mark Bickley who coached from round 19.
Nathan van Berlo was appointed captain and the leadership group consisted of Scott Stevens, Ben Rutten, Michael Doughty and Scott Thompson.

Squad
Statistics are correct as of start of 2010 season.
Flags represent place of birth.

Player changes for 2011

In

Out

NAB Cup
The 2011 NAB Cup was competed in a new format for the first time since 2003. Adelaide played two games on 11 February 2011, against Melbourne and Port Adelaide. Melbourne defeated Adelaide in the first game 0.5.4 (34) – 0.3.6 (24), but the team defeated cross town rivals Port Adelaide 0.6.4 (40) – 0.1.2 (8).

Adelaide didn't make it into the second round of the NAB Cup, but were to play NAB Challenge/practice matches for the rest of the competition. Adelaide played Fremantle at Thebarton Oval on 26 February. They won by 74 points 22.8 (140) – 10.6 (66). They then played Carlton at Visy Park on 4 March, losing by 34 points 15.10 (100) – 11.10 (76). In the final preseason match of 2011, Adelaide played Richmond, again at Visy Park on the 11th, this time coming up the winners by 68 points 18.14 (122) – 8.6 (54).

Home and Away season

Round 1

Round 2

Round 3

Round 4

Round 5

Round 6

Round 7

Round 8

Round 9

Round 10

Round 11

Round 12

Round 13

Round 14

Round 15

Round 16

Round 17

Round 18

Round 19

Round 20

Round 21

Round 22

Round 23

Round 24

Ladder

References

Adelaide Football Club seasons
Adelaide Football Club season